is a Japanese superhero film that released on February 23, 2013, and serves as an epilogue to Garo: Makai Senki. Ryosei Konishi was initially the only confirmed member of the cast, but Ray Fujita, Shouma Yamamoto, Ozuno Nakamura, Yukijirō Hotaru, Hironobu Kageyama, and Hiroyuki Watanabe were later confirmed to appear in the film. The guest stars in the film are Yuki Kubota, Anna Aoi, Tetsuya Yanagihara, and Keiko Matsuzaka.

Plot
After the events of Makai Flash Knight, Kouga Saezima appears before Gajari to honor the pact he forged in order to stop Sigma Fudō from killing all the Makai Knights. Once the two surviving knights run off, Kouga sees a blue skinned girl emerging from the picture frame. The girl introduces herself as Meru and that she is like every resident in the Promised Land: A living object.

Once there, Kouga encounters a fading scarecrow-like entity that transforms into a human-like form when he unintentionally named him "Kakashi". After Kakashi takes his leave, learning that he is in the  graveyard of those who lost their names and forms, Kouga and Meru are forced to run from the Nanashi reacting to the event. Once at the shrine, Kouga finds that its  is Zaruba who has no memory of Kouga and assumes a large form to reflect Kouga's imagination to have the human fight him for what he wants to know. Eventually, Zaruba remembers Kouga and revert to original form. Zaruba proceeds to reveal that Kouga's arrival has caused a time dilation and that he has served as the guardian for centuries before being reunited. Before anything else can be settled, Kouga calls out the mysterious gnome-like object that has been following them. Learning about the Maryu, a dark dragon that creates nothingness in its path and would emerge once the moon is completely black, Kouga and the others come to the suspected conclusion that the monster's fang is also the Fang of Sorrow. However, Kouge feels that finding his items should be his first priority before defeating the Maryu.

Once at the Land of Bliss, finding himself dancing with Meru, Kouga encounters Kakashi who provokes him into a duel before the harpy-like  appears. Revealed to be Kouga's coat, the harpy flies off with Kouga in pursuit while Kakashi follows after him. However, the three are captured by the Green Castle with Kouga meeting Judam and voicing his opinions on her heartless behavior for what she considers ugly and lustful greed for beautiful things. By then, thanks to Kakashi's trusted canine companion Kuromaru steering their Halloween-ish  house into the Green Castle, Kouga frees his coat and Kakashi so they can escape. After learning he needs the Garoken for his coat to recognize him, Kouga learns of Kakashi's plans to merge with the Maryu to become human. However, Judam took the Maryu scale needed for the fusion. But upon learning Kouga intends to kill the Maryu, Kakashi decides to finish their duel when Kiria arrives. Unfortunately, Kouga and Kiria find the Land of Bliss in ruins with the former helping the latter remember his best friend Raudo after he died. The two then find another survivor named Daruki, who reveals that Judam took Meru as an offering to the Maryu.

However, as Kakashi makes an attempt to reclaim the scale in a battle between his house and Judam's castle, Kiria saves Meru while Kouga sees the Garoken and reclaims the weapon. Seeing a ghost of Taiga appearing before him while regaining his coat, Kouga arrives to save Kakashi after his house is destroyed before making his way to the Green Castle to face Judam. Seeing her memory wiping against the human, Judam battles Kouga as she reveals that she will merge with the Maryu to enter the human world and destroy humanity for discarding her into the Promised Land. Kouga attempts to reason with Judam, but she refuses to listen as she uses the Maryu's scale transform into a small dragon. Despite its size, the Maryu quickly creates a giant mechanical construct around itself.

Donning Garo, Kouga chases after the Maryu as it attempts to transverse into the human world with his friends helping out. However, once in the space between dimensions, the Maryu is about to kill Garo with its  when Kakashi arrives the Makai Knight the energies within his heart. Riding a version of Goten, Blue Dragon Garo destroys the Maryu's construct to run Judam through. As Judam accepts Kouga's apology for humanity's discarding nature, the Maryuu dissolves with only a fang from its construct body remaining. Back in the Promised Land, Kouga finds Kakashi dying from his self sacrifices and learns that he was a training dummy Kouga sparred with as a child. After Kouga tells him that he was one of many who made him, Kakashi fades away with Kuromaru crying over his friend's departure. Once he arrives with Meru, revealed to be a pen in the human world, Kiria fades once his owner finds him alongside Kuromaru, who is a stuffed animal.

Destroying the Maryu's fang to Meru and Zaruba's shock, Kouga explains that he himself is the actual Fang of Sorrow. Meru is confused and Kouga explains to her that Gajari was a product of the Makai Knights' imagination and that the whole quest was for Kouga to understand the symbiosis of the dreamers and the dream. Gajari appears and congratulates Kouga for reaching that conclusion before transforming into a portal to send Kouga back to his world. Before he leaves, Kouga tells Meru that he knew the entire she was Rekka's dragonfish Kaoru as she returns to her true form to accompany Kouga. While visiting the remnants of Kakashi's true form, learning of a competition among the Makai Knights in his absence where the winner can visit one who is deceased, Kouga challenges the winner Rei to a duel with his father helping his opponent in spirit. Some time after, Kaoru at the park in the aftermath of her book's successful launch when she is reunited with Kouga. The story sets apart two different journeys from here. Kouga would continue his story in the mini-series Saejima Kouga and later The Moonbow Traveler. Kouga's son (Raiga) would start his journey as Garo in The Makai Flower and would join his father in The Moonbow Traveler.

Cast
: 
: 
: 
: 
: 
: 
: 
: 
: 
: 
: 
: 
: 
: 
, :

Theme song

Lyrics & Composition: Hironobu Kageyama
Arrangement: Yoshichika Kuriyama, Shiho Terada
Artist: JAM Project

References

External links
Garo: Soukoku no Maryu 

2013 films
2010s Japanese-language films
Soukoku no Maryu
Japanese 3D films
Martial arts horror films
Tokusatsu films
2010s Japanese films